is a railway station on the northern Ōu Main Line in the city of Hirakawa, Aomori Prefecture, Japan, operated by East Japan Railway Company (JR East).

Lines

Station layout
The station has one side platform and one island platform serving three tracks, connected to the station building by a footbridge. The station is staffed.

Platforms

History
Ikarigaseki Station was opened on 21 October 1895 as a station on the Japanese Government Railways system, which later became the Japanese National Railways (JNR). With the privatization of JNR on 1 April 1987, it came under the operational control of JR East.

Passenger statistics
In fiscal 2015, the station was used by an average of 113 passengers daily (boarding passengers only).

Surrounding area
Ikarigasaki Post Office
Former Ikarigaseki village hall
Ikarigaseki Elementary School
Ikarigaseki Junior High School

See also
 List of Railway Stations in Japan

References

External links

 

Stations of East Japan Railway Company
Railway stations in Aomori Prefecture
Ōu Main Line
Hirakawa, Aomori
Railway stations in Japan opened in 1895